Sir Charles Warwick Bampfylde, 5th Baronet (23 January 1753 – 19 April 1823) of Poltimore in Devon, was a British politician who served twice as Member of Parliament for Exeter, in 1774–1790 and 1796–1812.

Origins

He was the eldest surviving son of Sir Richard Bampfylde, 4th Baronet by his wife Jane Codrington (d. 1789), daughter and heiress of Colonel John Codrington of Charlton House, Wraxall, Somerset, near Bristol. He was baptised at St Augustine the Less Church, Bristol in Gloucestershire.

Career
Bampfylde was educated at New College, Oxford and was awarded the degree of Doctor of Civil Law (DCL). In 1776, he succeeded his father as baronet. He was High Sheriff of Somerset for 1820–21 after the death in office of Gerard Berkeley Napier.

Between 1774 and 1790 Bampfylde sat as Member of Parliament for Exeter. From 1796 he represented the constituency in the Parliament of Great Britain until the Act of Union in 1801, then in the Parliament of the United Kingdom until 1812.

Marriage and progeny

On 9 February 1776, at St James's Church, Piccadilly, he married Catharine Moore, eldest daughter of Admiral Sir John Moore, 1st Baronet, by whom he had two sons and a daughter:
George Bampfylde, 1st Baron Poltimore (1786–1858), eldest son and heir, in 1831 elevated to the peerage as Baron Poltimore.
Rev. Charles Bampfylde, a priest.
Louisa Bampfylde, wife of Lieutenant Edward Wells, Royal Navy.

Murder attempt and death
On 7 April 1823 a shot was fired at Bampfylde in front of his house at Montagu Square in London by a jealous ex-servant, whose wife was still working in Bampfylde's household. After he had seen his shot hitting Bampfylde, the man killed himself with a second pistol.

Bampfylde survived, but died two weeks later. An autopsy showed that the shot itself had passed the lungs and had come to a stillstand between the ribs, however that with the bullet also a little piece of his braces had entered the body and had effected a deadly gangrene. Bampfylde was buried at Hardington in Somerset.

Succession
His elder son George Bampfylde, 1st Baron Poltimore succeeded to the baronetcy and was later elevated to the peerage as Baron Poltimore.

References

External links

Burial record on findagrave.org

1753 births
1823 deaths
Alumni of New College, Oxford
Baronets in the Baronetage of England
British MPs 1774–1780
British MPs 1780–1784
British MPs 1784–1790
British MPs 1796–1800
Members of the Parliament of Great Britain for Exeter
Members of the Parliament of the United Kingdom for Exeter
UK MPs 1801–1802
UK MPs 1802–1806
UK MPs 1806–1807
UK MPs 1807–1812
High Sheriffs of Somerset